This is a complete list of operas by Antonio Vivaldi (1678–1741). He claimed to have composed 94 operas, but fewer than 50 titles have been identified, of which the scores of only 20 or so survive, wholly or in part. Moreover, the practice of reviving works under a different title and of creating pasticci has confused musicologists.

All of Vivaldi's operatic works are described as dramma per musica, roughly equivalent to opera seria.

Key: music completely lost; music preserved (at least in part)

51 items are listed.

List of operas

References

Further reading
Cross, Eric (1992), "Vivaldi, Antonio", in The New Grove Dictionary of Opera, ed. Stanley Sadie (London)

External links

 
Lists of operas by composer
Lists of compositions by composer